Terrasson is a railway station in Terrasson-Lavilledieu, Nouvelle-Aquitaine, France. The station is located on the Coutras - Tulle railway line. The station is served by TER (local) services operated by SNCF.

Train services

The station is served by regional trains to Bordeaux, Périgueux, Brive-la-Gaillarde and Ussel.

References

Railway stations in Dordogne